"Lessons" is the first episode of the seventh season of the television show Buffy the Vampire Slayer. Dawn finds vengeful spirits in the new Sunnydale High while Giles is rehabilitating Willow in England.

Plot 
In Istanbul, a dark-haired girl is pursued through an arched hallway by two people in hooded cloaks. After trying various escape routes, she is trapped in a dead-end. She sees a drain pipe and uses it to scale the building, barely escaping the duo and easily climbing up to the roof. There, another hooded figure is waiting and pushes her off the building. She screams, but she lands on the ground alive, on her back. Two hooded figures hold her down, yet she fights back. A third figure raises an arched, shiny, silver dagger and stabs her.

Buffy is in Sunnydale training her sister how to fight vampires. She instructs Dawn that fighting and slaying are about power. They discuss the fact that Sunnydale High has just reopened; Dawn will be attending for the first time. Xander, who is working construction at Sunnydale High, notes that the principal's office is right over the Hellmouth. Buffy follows Dawn into the school where she meets Principal Robin Wood.

Dawn goes into a bathroom, where she finds a mysterious talisman. Upon seeing the talisman, she sees a dead girl who threatens her. She says Buffy was unable to protect her, and that she will not be able to protect Dawn either. Buffy tries to warn Dawn, but ends up only embarrassing her in front of her whole class. Dawn then sees a similar dead student. She hurries to the bathroom where she meets Kit Holburn, who has also been seeing things. They are about to leave the bathroom when the floor caves in and they wind up in the high school basement. Dawn and Kit run into another student in the basement, Carlos Trejo, who says he saw a dead janitor. They are soon confronted by the three dead people, who tell them that everyone dies in Sunnydale, and they will be no different.

Dawn calls Buffy on her cell phone. Buffy descends into the basement to help Dawn, only to run into the three dead people herself. After a brief conversation (the dead girl, for example, says that she "was ripped to death by a werewolf"), Buffy realizes that the three dead people are trying to prevent her from going through a certain door. Buffy makes it to the door on her second try. She opens the door, but instead of finding Dawn and the other two students, Buffy finds a deranged Spike. Once Buffy locks the dead people out on the other side of the door, she realizes Spike is frail and unwell. She asks him about a series of cuts on his chest, and he replies that he tried to "cut it out". Before their conversation can continue, Dawn calls Buffy again. In spite of Spike's mad rambling, he is able to tell Buffy that the dead students are not zombies or ghosts, but actually manifest spirits controlled by a talisman, raised to seek vengeance. Buffy tells Dawn to find a weapon because the spirits are corporeal, and then leaves Spike alone, seeing that he is in no shape to help her.

Buffy then calls Xander and tells him to seek and destroy the talisman. Buffy follows Dawn's screams to another room in the basement, where she finds Dawn has made a weapon from a purse filled with bricks. Dawn throws the weapon to Buffy, who then fights the spirits off as Xander wrestles with one in the bathroom after locating the talisman. Xander breaks it and the spirits disappear.

Back in the school proper, Buffy sends Dawn, Kit, and Carlos off to class with some words of advice. Wood is impressed that Buffy is able to convince Kit and Carlos, the only two students with school records as long as Buffy's, to socialize and to go to class. He offers her a job working as an outreach counselor at the school, and she gladly accepts.

Spike huddles in the school basement and tells an apparition of Warren Mears that he has prepared a speech to give Buffy, but she will not understand what he has to say. As Warren paces around Spike, he morphs successively into Glory, Adam, Mayor Wilkins, Drusilla and the Master - the previous villains of the series in reverse order. They all speak to Spike about a plan "to go back to the beginning," and finally, the Master morphs into Buffy, telling Spike that it is not about right or wrong: it is about power.

Meanwhile, Willow is studying with Giles in Westbury, England. She studies magic and meditation with a coven of Wiccans that Giles knows. She is learning control, but feels frightened and distraught because she "killed people" and nearly destroyed the world with her dark magic. Later, she has a terrible vision of "the Earth's teeth" — the Hellmouth. She tells Giles, who has taught her that everything is connected, but not every connection is good.

Cast

Starring 
 Sarah Michelle Gellar as Buffy Summers/The First Evil
 Nicholas Brendon as Xander Harris
 Michelle Trachtenberg as Dawn Summers
 Emma Caulfield as Anya Jenkins
 James Marsters as Spike
 Alyson Hannigan as Willow Rosenberg

Special Guest Starring 
 Anthony Stewart Head as Rupert Giles

Guest Starring 
 DB Woodside as Robin Wood
 Alex Breckenridge as Kit Holburn
 Kali Rocha as Halfrek
 Mark Metcalf as The First/The Master
 Juliet Landau as The First/Drusilla
 Harry Groener as The First/Richard Wilkins
 George Hertzberg as The First/Adam
 Clare Kramer as The First/Glory
 Adam Busch as The First/Warren Mears
 David Zepeda as Carlos Trejo

Production 

The scenes set in Westbury were actually shot at Anthony Head's house in Somerset, England. He owns the horse seen in the episode, and it is named "Otto".

Kali Rocha filmed all of her scenes for this season in one day, including those in "Selfless".

Continuity
 As Buffy accompanies Dawn to her high school, she warns her to stay away from "hyena people, lizardy-type athletes and invisible people" referencing the monsters Buffy encountered throughout her high school in season 1 and 2.
 Willow says that her helpers in the coven look at her as though "I'm gonna turn them all into bangers and mash, or something." Bangers and mash is a traditional English dish, consisting of sausages (bangers) and mashed potatoes.
 As Buffy, Dawn and her friends are exiting the basement, Buffy comments that the school seems 'a bit smaller,' which is the same comment Willow and Xander make as they walk through the charred remains in season 4.
 Halfrek says, "Do I have to mention Mrs. Czolgosz?" A writer at the BuffyGuide.com site says, "Czolgosz... President William McKinley at the Buffalo Pan-American Exposition in September 1901. In 1900, Czolgosz, then 23, married Emma Wisemki, a 17-year-old German immigrant whom he had apparently gotten pregnant... Stephen Sondheim, of whom Joss Whedon is a big fan, wrote about this event in "The Ballad of Czolgosz" in his musical Assassins.
 Spike's in the basement of the newly refurbished Sunnydale High, The First appears before him as a host of former villains: Warren, Glory, Adam, the Mayor, Drusilla and Buffy's first big bad, the Master, and since it is able to appear as those who have died, its last manifestation is as Buffy herself.
 This is the only time that Spike and the Master appear together, though the Master is only a manifestation of the First, and Spike and the Master never actually met onscreen. Spike and Mayor Wilkins have not met onscreen, either.
 In season 6's DVD extras, the cast appeared on Academy of TV Arts and Sciences Panel Discussion. Here Michelle Trachtenberg said that she'd been begging Whedon to let her character wear black, seeing as she'd never been allowed to in order to keep her looking youthful and innocent. Dawn is seen wearing almost all black here on her first day of school.
 Buffy gives Dawn, Kit, and Carlos advice after rescuing them from the basement: "School is intense, but you'll do all right as long as you're careful. And you might want to think about sticking together." Kit and Carlos do not, however, appear in later episodes, although Dawn is on the phone with Kit when the First begins causing chaos at the Summers house.

Arc significance

 The First comments, in the guise of Buffy, that everything is about 'Power' (which is the theme of season seven). This is a conclusion that Buffy herself comes to twice: once while facing Glory and then again in the series finale.
 The First makes its first appearance since season 3, where it was seen tormenting the first vampire with a soul, Angel.
 The First was able to come back to attempt the annihilation of the Slayer line through Buffy's resurrection, which was carried out at the beginning of the 6th season by Willow, Xander, Anya, and Tara.
 While in the basement Spike talks to the First saying "I had a speech I learned it all." Spike professes this speech to Buffy in the next episode.

Pop culture allusions
 Willow says to Giles that "you go all Dumbledore on me."
 Dawn says, "Check out double-O Xander," referring to James Bond, code name 007.
 When Xander teasingly asks Buffy how you "make" cereal, she says, "I saw it on The Food Channel."
 As Dawn leaves Buffy in the High School, she references The Twilight Zone episode "To Serve Man": "I know: You never know what's coming. The stake is not the power. To Serve Man is a cookbook. I love you. Go away."
 Dawn tells her teacher and class, "I'm very into Britney Spears' early work."
 Principal Wood says, "Curiouser and curiouser." This is a reference to the 1865 Lewis Carroll book Alice's Adventures in Wonderland; Chapter Two begins with Alice exclaiming, "Curiouser and curiouser!"

References

External links 

 

Buffy the Vampire Slayer (season 7) episodes
2002 American television episodes
Television episodes about ghosts
Television episodes written by Joss Whedon
Television episodes about revenge
Television episodes about zombies
Television episodes set in England
Television episodes set in Turkey